Lauren Nicole Carlini (born February 28, 1995) is an American volleyball player. She plays for the United States women's volleyball team. She won the 2016 Sullivan Award as America's best amateur athlete.

College
Lauren was raised in an Italian-American family in Illinois.
She played for University of Wisconsin. While at Wisconsin, Carlini was named as one of the four finalists for the Honda Sports Award in volleyball for both the 2014–15 season as well as the 2015–16 season.

International career

On a club level, she plays for THY.

In May 2021, she was named to the 18-player roster for the FIVB Volleyball Nations League tournament. that was played May 25-June 24 in Rimini, Italy. It was the only major international competition before the Tokyo Olympics.

She was a selected as an Olympic alternate for the 2020 Summer Olympics.

References

External links 
 FIVB profile
 https://volleyballmag.com/carlini-050818/

1995 births
Living people
American women's volleyball players
Wisconsin Badgers women's volleyball players
Setters (volleyball)
Serie A1 (women's volleyball) players
American people of Italian descent
James E. Sullivan Award recipients
21st-century American women
American expatriate sportspeople in Russia
American expatriate sportspeople in Turkey
Expatriate volleyball players in Italy
Expatriate volleyball players in Turkey
Sportspeople from Aurora, Illinois